Peri-Banu is a crater in the northern hemisphere of Saturn's moon Enceladus.  Peri-Banu was first discovered in Voyager 2 images but was seen at much higher resolution, though near the terminator, by Cassini.  It is located at 62° North Latitude, 322.9° West Longitude and is 18 kilometers across.  The western portion of the crater is largely absent, either buried or disrupted by the eastern margin of Samarkand Sulci.   A large, dome-like structure occupies the interior of the crater, caused by infill of material from Samarkand Sulci or from viscous relaxation.

The name comes from Pari-Banou, a genie-woman from Arabian Nights, incarnation of beauty, who marries Ahmed and helps him fulfill the demands of his father.

References

External links
Hamah Sulci (Se-5) at  PIA12783: The Enceladus Atlas

Impact craters on Enceladus